Mario Müller (born 16 January 1992) is a German professional footballer who plays as a left-back or left midfielder for Astoria Walldorf.

Career
After playing youth football with Waldhof Mannheim and Karlsruher SC and senior football with Karlsruher SC II, 1. FC Kaiserslautern II and Eintracht Trier, Müller signed for Regionalliga Südwest side 1. FC Saarbrücken on a two-year contract in summer 2016.

Personal life
Müller was born in Mannheim. He is the stepson of Alois Schwartz.

References

External links
 

1992 births
Living people
Footballers from Mannheim
German footballers
Association football fullbacks
Association football midfielders
Karlsruher SC II players
1. FC Kaiserslautern II players
SV Eintracht Trier 05
1. FC Saarbrücken players
FC Astoria Walldorf players
3. Liga players
Regionalliga players